The Cambria Iron Company of Johnstown, Pennsylvania was a major 19th-century industrial producer of iron and steel founded in 1852. The company had the nation's largest steel foundry in the 1870s and was renamed the Cambria Steel Company in 1898. The company used many innovations in the steelmaking process, including those of William Kelly and Henry Bessemer. The company was acquired in 1923 by the Bethlehem Steel Company. The company's historic facilities, extending some  along the Conemaugh and Little Conemaugh Rivers, are a National Historic Landmark District.

Several works by the firm are listed on the National Register of Historic Places.

Name history
The Cambria Iron Works was reorganized in 1898 and renamed the Cambria Steel Company. In 1916, the Midvale Steel and Ordnance Company bought the Cambria Steel Company and sold it to the Bethlehem Steel Company in 1923.

Facilities
The industrial facilities of the Cambria occupied five separate sites in and around Johnstown, Pennsylvania. Its earliest facilities, known as the Lower Works, are located on the east bank of the Conemaugh River, north of downtown Johnstown and the Little Conemaugh River. 

The Gautier Plant is just northeast of downtown Johnstown on the south side of the Little Conemaugh. Further up that River is the extensive Franklin Plant and Wheel Plant, while the Rod and Wire Plant is located on the west side of the Conemaugh River, north of the Lower Works. Each of these facilities represents a different phase of development and growth of the steel industry; however, the Lower Works no longer has significant traces of the earliest facilities used in steel manufacturing. All five of these areas comprise the National Historic Landmark District designated in 1989.

Company history

The Cambria Iron Company was founded in 1852 to provide iron for the construction of railroads. In 1854, the iron works, which had gone out of the blast, were purchased by a group of Philadelphia merchants led by Matthew Newkirk. After a fire destroyed the main rolling mill in 1857, Newkirk persuaded his co-investors to rebuild it on a larger scale.

The company grew rapidly and was, by the 1870s, a leading producer of steel and an innovator in the advancement of steelmaking technology. It performed early experiments with the Kelly converter, built the first blooming mill, and was one of the first plants to use hydraulics for the movement of ingots. It built one of the first plants to use the Bessemer process for making steel at a large scale. The company's innovations, methods, and processes were widely influential throughout the steel industry.

The company was at its height in the 1870s, under the long-term leadership of general manager Daniel Johnson Morrell, who had overseen the expansion of the works into one of the largest producers of rails in the United States, helping to end dependence on British railroad construction imports. He was a member of the 40th United States Congress and 41st United States Congress.

Morrell became concerned about the South Fork Dam, which formed Lake Conemaugh above Johnstown and Cambria Iron Company's facilities. To monitor the dam, Morrell joined South Fork Fishing and Hunting Club, which owned the dam. Morrell campaigned to club officials to improve the dam, which he had inspected by his own engineers and by those of the Pennsylvania Railroad. Morrell even offered to effect repairs, partially at his own expense, but was rejected by club president Benjamin F. Ruff. Morell died in 1885, his warnings unheeded.

On May 31, 1889, the dam failed, unleashing the Johnstown Flood. The flood killed more than 2,200 people—then the largest disaster in U.S. history—and badly damaged the Cambria Iron Company's facilities. The company reopened on June 6, 1889, and continued to operate independently, though eclipsed in size by other producers, following the flood.

Morell's membership in the club was purchased by Cyrus Elder, chief legal counsel for Cambria Iron Company. A former news editor, Elder was the only Johnstown native who was a member of the club and lost his wife and a daughter in the flood. He was and remained a notable civic leader and wrote books and poetry.

In 1916, the company was acquired by Midvale Steel and Ordnance Company. Midvale sold the company to Bethlehem Steel in 1923, and it operated continuously until 1992.

Cambria Steel Company formed a proprietary subsidiary shipping company called Franklin Steamship Company of Cleveland in 1906 and Beaver Steamship Company in 1916. Both companies were sold to Bethlehem Steamship Company in 1924.

Works produced
Infrastructure whose parts were manufactured by the Cambria Company include (with variations in attribution):
Boone River Bridge, Buchanan Avenue over Boone River, Goldfield, Iowa (Cambria Steel Company), NRHP-listed
Eldorado Bridge, State Street over Turkey River, Eldorado, Iowa (Cambria Steel Co.), NRHP-listed
Johnstown Inclined Railway, Johns Street and Edgehill Drive, Johnstown, Pennsylvania (Cambria Iron Co.), NRHP-listed
Neligh Mill Bridge, Elm Street over Elkhorn River, Neligh, Nebraska (Cambria/Lackawanna Steel Cos.), NRHP-listed

See also
 Rolling Mill Mine
 List of National Historic Landmarks in Pennsylvania
 National Register of Historic Places listings in Cambria County, Pennsylvania

References

External links

History of the Steel Industry in Johnstown
Lists of National Historic Landmarks

Steel companies of the United States
National Historic Landmarks in Pennsylvania
Historic American Engineering Record in Pennsylvania
Buildings and structures in Johnstown, Pennsylvania
Bridge companies
1852 establishments in Pennsylvania
National Register of Historic Places in Cambria County, Pennsylvania
Historic districts on the National Register of Historic Places in Pennsylvania
Blacksmith shops
Blast furnaces
Rolling mills
Construction and civil engineering companies of the United States
Construction and civil engineering companies established in 1852
American companies established in 1852